The 1967 Stanford Indians baseball team represented Stanford University in the 1967 NCAA University Division baseball season. The Indians played their home games at Sunken Diamond. The team was coached by Dutch Fehring in his 12th year at Stanford.

The Indians won the District VIII Playoff to advanced to the College World Series, where they were defeated by the Arizona State.

Roster

Schedule 

! style="" | Regular Season
|- valign="top" 

|- align="center" bgcolor="#ccffcc"
| 1 || February  ||  || Unknown • Unknown || 8–0 || 1–0 || –
|-

|- align="center" bgcolor="#ccffcc"
| 2 || March  ||  || Unknown • Unknown || 7–0 || 2–0 || –
|- align="center" bgcolor="#ccffcc"
| 3 || March  ||  || Unknown • Unknown || 6–3 || 3–0 || –
|- align="center" bgcolor="#ccffcc"
| 4 || March  ||  || Unknown • Unknown || 3–0 || 4–0 || –
|- align="center" bgcolor="#ccffcc"
| 5 || March  ||  || Unknown • Unknown || 7–2 || 5–0 || –
|- align="center" bgcolor="#ccffcc"
| 6 || March  ||  || Unknown • Unknown || 13–3 || 6–0 || –
|- align="center" bgcolor="#ffcccc"
| 7 || March  || Cal Poly Pomona || Unknown • Unknown || 1–2 || 6–1 || –
|- align="center" bgcolor="#ccffcc"
| 8 || March  ||  || Unknown • Unknown || 5–3 || 7–1 || –
|- align="center" bgcolor="#ccffcc"
| 9 || March  || San Diego Marines || Unknown • Unknown || 17–0 || 8–1 || –
|- align="center" bgcolor="#ccffcc"
| 10 || March  || San Diego Marines || Unknown • Unknown || 1–0 || 9–1 || –
|- align="center" bgcolor="#ccffcc"
| 11 || March 29 || at  || Unknown • San Diego, California || 1–0 || 10–1 || –
|-

|- align="center" bgcolor="#ccffcc"
| 12 || April 8 ||  || Sunken Diamond • Stanford, California || 7–3 || 11–1 || –
|- align="center" bgcolor="#ccffcc"
| 13 || April 8 || Air Force || Sunken Diamond • Stanford, California || 7–3 || 12–1 || –
|- align="center" bgcolor="#ccffcc"
| 14 || April  ||  || Unknown • Unknown || 2–1 || 13–1 || –
|- align="center" bgcolor="#ccffcc"
| 15 || April  ||  || Sunken Diamond • Stanford, California || 4–1 || 14–1 || 1–0
|- align="center" bgcolor="#ccffcc"
| 16 || April  || Oregon State || Sunken Diamond • Stanford, California || 2–1 || 15–1 || 2–0
|- align="center" bgcolor="#ccffcc"
| 17 || April 22 ||  || Bovard Field • Los Angeles, California || 4–1 || 16–1 || 3–0
|- align="center" bgcolor="#ffcccc"
| 18 || April 22 || Southern California || Bovard Field • Los Angeles, California || 2–6 || 16–2 || 3–1
|- align="center" bgcolor="#ccffcc"
| 19 || April  || at  || San Jose Municipal Stadium • San Jose, California || 8–0 || 17–2 || 3–1
|- align="center" bgcolor="#fffdd0"
| 20 || April 28 || Southern California || Sunken Diamond • Stanford, California || 3–3 || 17–2–1 || 3–1–1
|- align="center" bgcolor="#ccffcc"
| 21 || April 29 ||  || Sunken Diamond • Stanford, California || 8–3 || 18–2–1 || 4–1–1
|- align="center" bgcolor="#ccffcc"
| 22 || April 29 || UCLA || Sunken Diamond • Stanford, California || 9–2 || 19–2–1 || 5–1–1
|-

|- align="center" bgcolor="#ccffcc"
| 23 || May 2 || San Jose State || Sunken Diamond • Stanford, California || 6–1 || 20–2–1 || 5–1–1
|- align="center" bgcolor="#ccffcc"
| 24 || May  || San Diego Marines || Unknown • Unknown || 6–5 || 21–2–1 || 5–1–1
|- align="center" bgcolor="#ffcccc"
| 25 || May  ||  || Unknown • Unknown || 4–5 || 21–3–1 || 5–1–1
|- align="center" bgcolor="#ccffcc"
| 26 || May  ||  || Unknown • Unknown || 10–2 || 22–3–1 || 6–1–1
|- align="center" bgcolor="#ccffcc"
| 27 || May  ||  || Unknown • Unknown || 17–8 || 23–3–1 || 6–1–1
|- align="center" bgcolor="#ccffcc"
| 28 || May  || at  || Old Graves Field • Seattle, Washington || 7–0 || 24–3–1 || 7–1–1
|- align="center" bgcolor="#ccffcc"
| 29 || May  || at Washington || Old Graves Field • Seattle, Washington || 3–1 || 25–3–1 || 8–1–1
|- align="center" bgcolor="#ccffcc"
| 30 || May  || San Francisco State || Unknown • Unknown || 11–5 || 26–3–1 || 8–1–1
|- align="center" bgcolor="#ccffcc"
| 31 || May  || California || Unknown • Unknown || 5–1 || 27–3–1 || 9–1–1
|- align="center" bgcolor="#ccffcc"
| 32 || May  || California || Unknown • Unknown || 6–3 || 28–3–1 || 10–1–1
|-

|-
|-
! style="" | Postseason
|- valign="top"

|- align="center" bgcolor="#ffcccc"
| 36 || May  ||  || Sunken Diamond • Stanford, California || 3–7 || 31–4–1 || 10–1–1
|- align="center" bgcolor="#ccffcc"
| 37 || May  || at Fresno State || Varsity Park • Fresno, California || 6–3 || 32–4–1 || 10–1–1
|- align="center" bgcolor="#ccffcc"
| 38 || May  || at Fresno State || Varsity Park • Fresno, California || 6–4 || 33–4–1 || 10–1–1
|-

|- align="center" bgcolor="#ccffcc"
| 39 || June 12 || vs Houston || Johnny Rosenblatt Stadium • Omaha, Nebraska || 12–1 || 34–4–1 || 10–1–1
|- align="center" bgcolor="#ccffcc"
| 40 || June 14 || vs  || Johnny Rosenblatt Stadium • Omaha, Nebraska || 6–3 || 35–4–1 || 10–1–1
|- align="center" bgcolor="#ffcccc"
| 41 || June 15 || vs Arizona State || Johnny Rosenblatt Stadium • Omaha, Nebraska || 3–5 || 35–5–1 || 10–1–1
|- align="center" bgcolor="#ccffcc"
| 42 || June 16 || vs Auburn || Johnny Rosenblatt Stadium • Omaha, Nebraska || 5–3 || 36–5–1 || 10–1–1
|- align="center" bgcolor="#ffcccc"
| 43 || June 17 || vs Arizona State || Johnny Rosenblatt Stadium • Omaha, Nebraska || 3–4 || 36–6–1 || 10–1–1
|-

|-
|

Awards and honors 
Frank Duffy
 First Team All-AAWU
 Second Team All-American American Baseball Coaches Association
 First Team All-American The Sporting News

Mark Marquess
 First Team All-AAWU
 First Team All-American American Baseball Coaches Association
 First Team All-American The Sporting News

Mike Schomaker
 First Team All-AAWU
 Second Team All-American American Baseball Coaches Association

Sandy Vance
 First Team All-AAWU

References 

Stanford Cardinal baseball seasons
Stanford Indians baseball
College World Series seasons
Stanford
Pac-12 Conference baseball champion seasons